By Request is an album by American country singer Ernest Tubb, released in 1966 (see 1966 in music).

Track listing 
 "I'll Be There (If You Ever Want Me)" (Ray Price, Rusty Gabbard)	  
 "With Tears in My Eyes" (Paul Howard)
 "Release Me" (Eddie Miller, W. S. Stevenson)
 "Last Goodbye" (Ernest Tubb, Sammy Farsmark)
 "Forgive Me" (Wiley Walker, Gene Sullivan)
 "Mom and Dad's Waltz" (Lefty Frizzell)
 "Too Many Rivers" (Harlan Howard)
 "My Shoes Keep Walking Back to You" (Bob Wills, Lee Ross)
 "Lost Highway" (Leon Payne)
 "You'll Still Be in My Heart" (Buddy Starcher, Ted West)
 "Born to Lose" (Frankie Brown)
 "Hello Trouble (Come on In)" (Orville Couch, Eddie McDuff)

Personnel 
 Ernest Tubb – vocals, guitar
 Leon Rhodes – guitar
 Jerry Shook – guitar, bass
 Cal Smith – guitar
 Buddy Charleton – pedal steel guitar
 Jack Drake – bass
 Jack Greene – drums
 Jerry Smith – piano

Chart positions

References 

Ernest Tubb albums
1966 albums
Albums produced by Owen Bradley
Decca Records albums